In this article are the confirmed national softball squads for the 2022 Men's Softball World Championship, to be held in Auckland, New Zealand between, 26 November and 4 December 2022. Each team must name a roster of 12 to 16 players. The final squad lists were confirmed by World Baseball Softball Confederation on the 26 November 2022 before the tournament commenced.

Group A

Argentina
Argentina announced their squad on the 14 October.

Cuba
Cuba finalised their squad on 28 October.

Czech Republic
The Czech Republic squad was announced on 13 September.

New Zealand
New Zealand announced their world cup squad on 25 October.

Philippines
The Philippines squad was confirmed on 26 November by WBSC.

United States
United States announced their world cup squad on 30 September.

Group B

Australia
Australia's world championship squad was announced on 28 September.

Canada
Canada announced their world cup squad on 9 September.

Denmark
The Denmark squad was confirmed on 26 November by WBSC.

Japan
The Denmark squad was confirmed on 26 November by WBSC.

South Africa
South Africa announced their world cup squad on 1 September.

Venezuela
Venezuela announced their world cup squad on 26 November 2022 via WBSC.

References

World Championship
Softball World Championship, 2022
Men's Softball World Championship